Elena Aleksandrovna Vorobeva  Oblova (born 18 April 1988 in Kolomna) is a Croatian sailor.

Career 
She competed for Russia at the 2012 Summer Olympics in London/Weymouth sailing the Elliott 6m Class with her teammates Yekaterina Skudina and Yelena Syuzeva.

She competed for Croatia at the 2020 Summer Olympics in Tokyo sailing the Laser Radial.

References

External links
 
 
  (2020)
  (2012)
  
 15-Elena Vorobeva – JEDRENJE11

1988 births
Living people
People from Kolomna
Russian female sailors (sport)
Croatian female sailors (sport)
Olympic sailors of Russia
Olympic sailors of Croatia
Sailors at the 2012 Summer Olympics – Elliott 6m
Sailors at the 2020 Summer Olympics – Laser Radial
Naturalized citizens of Croatia
Sportspeople from Moscow Oblast